The ISU Coupe du Printemps (French for Spring Cup) is an annual figure skating competition held in March in Kockelscheuer, Luxembourg. The competition may include men's singles, ladies' singles, and pairs from senior to novice levels, and recognized by the International Skating Union (ISU), the world's highest instance of skating.

Senior medalists

Men

Women

Pairs

Junior medalists

Men

Women

Pairs

Advanced novice medalists

Men

Ladies

References

External links 

 Coupe du Printemps official site

Figure skating competitions
Figure skating in Luxembourg